Luiz Fernando Ruffato de Souza (Cataguases, Brazil, February 1961) is a contemporary Brazilian writer. An alumnus of the Federal University of Juiz de Fora in the Brazilian state of Minas Gerais, Ruffato worked as a journalist in São Paulo and published in several fiction books including História dos Remorsos e Rancores (1998) and Eles Eram Muitos Cavalos (They were Many Horses) (2001). The latter garnered the APCA literary prize.

Born to an immigrant and working-class family in Cataguazes, Luiz Ruffato had an early inclination to literature. Nonetheless, following the request of his mother – who was a Portuguese washerwoman – and father – who was an Italian popcorn salesman – Ruffato had an apprenticeship as salesman in Cataguases before moving to Juiz de Fora and studying journalism. In Juiz de Fora, Ruffato worked as a mechanic during the day and studied journalism during the night. His working class and immigrant inheritance is reflected in his work. His cycle of five novels entitled "Inferno Provisório" (Temporary Hell) portrays the story of Brazilian industrialization from the 1950s on. Once he graduated as a journalist, Ruffato moved to São Paulo to work in his new profession. São Paulo also became the stage, along with Minas Gerais, to Ruffato's short stories and novels. "Eles Eram Muitos Cavalos" tells, in 69 fragments, the daily life and contradictions at São Paulo, Brazil's biggest metropolis.

Ruffato is also one of the founders of the Church of the Book as Transformation (Igreja do Livro Transformador), a secular movement that encourages reading in Brazil. The movement believes that books can change the lives of people in subtle and radical ways.

In 2012 Luiz Ruffato was distinguished as Brazilian Writer in Residence at the Center for Latin American Studies at UC Berkeley. In 2013 his novel "Domingos Sem Deus" was awarded the Casa de las Américas Prize.

Main works

Early works 

Ruffato's first published work was the short stories collection Histórias de Remorsos e Rancores  (1998). Made up of seven short stories, Histórias de Remorsos e Rancores was centered in a set of characters from the “beco do Zé” (Zé's alley), in Cataguases, Ruffatos city of origin. The short stories are neither interrelated nor have a chronological order. The only thing that connect them are the poor working class characters, underemployed or in illegal trades such as prostitution. The book was well received by the specialized critique.

In 2000 Ruffato published another collection of short stories, called (os sobreviventes). The book received an honorable mention at the Premio Casa de las Américas in 2001. The book is made of six short stories – “A solução”, "O segredo", "Carta a uma jovem senhora", “A expiação”, "Um outro mundo" e “Aquário” – in which all characters are representative of the lower proletariat of, once again, Cataguases. All stories deal with the hardship of life the suffering of the lower classes and a pervasive lack of hope. The language of the stories explore the spoken vernacular and popular expressions.

Eles eram muitos cavalos (They were many horses) 
Ruffato's first novel, eles eram muitos cavalos was published in 2001. It won the prize Troféu APCA e Prêmio Machado de Assis for best novel of 2001. With a non linear structure, the book is made of 70 fragments. All fragments happen in the same day (05/09/2000) in the city of São Paulo. The novel's title is an allusion to a poem by the Brazilian poet Cecília Meirelles, called “Dos Cavalos da Inconfidência”.

The novel's idea came from Ruffato's will to make a tribute to São Paulo, the Brazilian metropolis that welcomed so many migrants like Ruffato himself. The book's (lack of) structure reflects the impossibility of reproducing the complexity and dynamism of the city. The book draws from several social classes and social discourses (including advertising, theatrical etc.) represented in a multiplicity of literary styles (poetry, theater etc.). According to Ruffato, this book is not exactly a novel, but a sort of literary installation and homage to São Paulo.

Inferno Provisório (Temporary Hell) 
In 2005 Ruffato started – with the novel Mamma, Son Tanto Felice – a series called "Temporary Hell", made up of five volumes. The series continued withO Mundo Inimigo, published a year later. And, later on, Vista Parcial da Noite (2006), O Livro das Impossibilidades (2008) and Domingos sem Deus (2011).

Ruffato's project was fictionalize the story of the Brazilian working class, from the beginning of the twentieth century to the beginning of the twenty-first century. Each volume deals with a particular moment in the history of Brazilian proletariat. According to Ruffato, in a 2008 interview,:

Mamma, son tanto Felice deals with the question of the exodus from countryside to the city in the 50s and 60s; O Mundo Inimigo discuss the establishment of this first generation of proletarians in a small Brazilian industrial city in the 60s and 70s; Vista Parcial da Noite describes the confrontation of the rural and urban imaginaries in the 70s and 80s. The fourth volume, O Livro das Impossibilidades, traces the behavioral changes of the 80s and 90s while the last volume, [Domingos Sem Deus] inquires into the beginning of the twenty-first century.

According to Ruffato, this long project was imagined even before he had published his earlier novels. Glimpses of this narrative appears in his short stories collections. From conception to publication, the series took more than 20 years of work.

Other works 
In 2007 Ruffato was invited to write for the collection “Amores Expressos,” a collection of love stories published by Companhia das Letras, one of Brazil's most important publishing houses. The project sent different writers to different cities in the world, where their assignment was to reside and to write a love story. Ruffato was invited to travel to Lisbon in Portugal. In 2009 he published the novel Estive em Lisboa e lembrei de você as the result of his participation in the project. The book tells the story of Sérgio, a native of Cataguases, who moves to Lisbon in search of work and as a way to restart his life away from the hardship of his native city. The story is told through the life of Sérgio and depicts the drama of many Brazilian immigrants that go to Portugal in search of better conditions of life but end up working lower-skill and lower-paying jobs.

Ruffato also wrote the poetry collections As máscaras singulares (2002) e Paráguas verdes (2011). He also published an essay about the modernist movement of his native Cataguases, was anthologized in several collections and organized many other anthologies and collections such as 25 mulheres que estão fazendo a nova literatura brasileira (2005) and the short story of Luiz Fernando Emediato (2004).

List of works

First Brazilian Editions name 

 Short stories
 Historias de Remorsos e Rancores – São Paulo: Boitempo, 1998.
 (os sobreviventes) – São Paulo: Boitempo, 2000.

 Novels
 Eles eram muitos cavalos – São Paulo: Boitempo, 2001.
 Mamma, son tanto felice (Inferno Provisório: Volume I). Rio de Janeiro: Record, 2005.
 O mundo inimigo (Inferno Provisório: Volume II). Rio de Janeiro: Record, 2005.
 Vista parcial da noite (Inferno Provisório: Volume III). Rio de Janeiro: Record, 2006.
 De mim já nem se lembra. São Paulo: Moderna, 2007.
 O livro das impossibilidades (Inferno Provisório: Volume IV). Rio de Janeiro: Record, 2008.
 Estive em Lisboa e lembrei de você. São Paulo: Cia das Letras, 2009.
 Domingos sem Deus (Inferno Provisório: Volume V). Rio de Janeiro: Record, 2011.

 Poetry
 As máscaras singulares – São Paulo: Boitempo, 2002 (poemas)
 Paráguas verdes – São Paulo: Ateliê Acaia, 2011.

 Essays
 Os ases de Cataguases (uma história dos primórdios do Modernismo) – Cataguases: Fundação Francisca de Souza Peixoto, 2002.

 Organized Collections
 Leituras de Escritor. Coleção Comboio de Corda – São Paulo: Edições SM, 2008.
 Sabe com quem está falando? contos sobre corrupção e poder – Rio de Janeiro: Língua Geral, 2012.
 Questão de Pele – Rio de Janeiro: Língua Geral (2009)
 RUFFATO, Luiz & RUFFATO, Simone (orgs.). Fora da ordem e do progresso – São Paulo: Geração Editorial, 2004.
 Emediato, Luiz Fernando. Trevas no paraíso: histórias de amor e guerra nos anos de chumbo –  São Paulo: Geração Editorial, 2004.
 25 mulheres que estão fazendo a nova Literatura Brasileira –  Rio de Janeiro: Record, 2005.
 Mais 30 mulheres que estão fazendo a nova Literatura Brasileira – Rio de Janeiro: Record, 2005.
 Tarja preta – Rio de Janeiro: Objetiva, 2005.
 Quando fui outro – Rio de Janeiro: Objetiva, 2006.
 Francisco Inácio Peixoto em Prosa e Poesia – Cataguases, Instituto Francisca de Souza Peixoto, 2008.
 Contos antológicos de Roniwalter Jatobá – São Paulo: Nova Alexandria, 2009.
 Mário de Andrade: seus contos preferidos – Rio de Janeiro: Tinta Negra, 2011.
 A alegria é a prova dos nove – São Paulo: Globo, 2011.

 Anthologized Works
 Olívia. In: Marginais do Pomba – Cataguases, Fundação Cultural Francisco Inácio Peixoto, 1985, p. 69-73.
 O profundo silêncio das manhãs de domingo. In: Novos contistas mineiros – Porto Alegre, Mercado Aberto, 1988, p. 83-85.
 Lembranças. In: 21 contos pelo telefone – São Paulo, DBA, 2001, p. 73-75.
 O ataque. In: OLIVEIRA, Nelson de (org.). Geração 90: manuscritos de computador – São Paulo: Boitempo Editorial, 2001, p. 223-238.
 Depoimento. In: MARGATO, Isabel e GOMES, Renato Cordeiro (org.). Espécies de espaço: territorialidades, literatura, mídia – Belo Horizonte: Editora UFMG, 2008.
 O prefeito não gosta que lhe olhem nos olhos. In: PENTEADO, Rodrigo (org.). Corrupção – 18 contos. Transparência Brasil/Ateliê, 2002, p. 71-73.
 André (a.C.). In: DENSER, Márcia (org.). Os apóstolos – doze revelações – São Paulo: Nova Alexandria, 2002, p. 24-35.
 Vertigem. In: GARCIA-ROZA, Lívia (org.). Ficções fraternas – Rio de Janeiro: Record, 2003, p. 71-87.
 Paisagem sem história. In: FREIRE, Marcelino; OLIVEIRA, Nelson de (orgs.). PS: SP – São Paulo, Ateliê, 2003, p. 58-63.
 Assim. In: FREIRE, Marcelino (org.). Os cem menores contos brasileiros do século – São Paulo, Ateliê, 2004, p. 52.
 Paisagem sem história. In: Geração Linguagem – São Paulo, Sesc-SP/Lazuli, 2004, p. 67-74.
 Kate (Irinéia). Inspiração – São Paulo, F.S Editor, 2004, p. 111-113.
 O profundo silêncio das manhãs de domingo. In: RESENDE, Beatriz (org.). A literatura Latino-americana do século XXI – Rio de Janeiro, Aeroplano, 2005, p. 56-66.
 Sem remédio. In: Tarja preta – Rio de Janeiro, Objetiva, 2005, p. 65-77.
 Cicatrizes (uma história de futebol). In: COELHO, Eduardo (org.). Donos da bola – Rio de Janeiro, Língua Geral, 2006, p. 86-96.
 Mirim. In: LAJOLO, Marisa (org.). Histórias de quadros e leitores – São Paulo, Moderna, 2006, p. 75-81.
 Trens. In: MORAES, Angélica (org.). O trem – crônicas e contos em torno da obra de Thomaz Ianelli – São Paulo, Metalivros, 2006, p. 57-63.
 O repositor. In: GONÇALVES, Magaly Trindade; AQUINO, Zélia Thomas; BELLODI, Zina C. (orgs.). Antologia comentada de literatura brasileira – poesia e prosa – Petrópolis, Vozes, 2007, p. 533-534.
 Ciranda. In: OLIVEIRA, Nelson de (org.). Cenas da favela – as melhores histórias da periferia brasileira – Rio de Janeiro, Geração Editorial, 2007, p. 118-130.
 Paisagem sem história. In: MOREIRA, Moacyr Godoy (org.). Contos de agora – audiobook – São Paulo: Livro Falante, 2007.
 COELHO, Eduardo e DEBELLIAN, Marcio (orgs.). Liberdade até agora – São Paulo: Móbile, 2011.

Translations 
 Finnish
 Pilkun paikka [Entre as quatro linhas]. Tradução Jyrki Lappi-Seppälä. Nurmijärvi: Aviador, 2014.
 Rutosti hevosia [Eles eram muitos cavalos]. Tradução Jyrki Lappi-Seppälä. Helsinki: Into, 2014.
 German
 Es waren viele Pferde [Eles eram muitos cavalos]. Tradução Michael Kegler. Berlim: Assoziation A, 2012.

 Spanish
 Ellos eran muchos caballos [Eles eram muitos cavalos]. Tradução Mario Camara. Buenos Aires: Eterna Cadencia, 2010.
 Estuve en Lisboa y me acordé de ti. [Estive em Lisboa e lembrei de você]. Tradução Mario Camara. Buenos Aires: Eterna Cadencia, 2011.
 Mamma, son tanto Felice. Tradução Maria Cristina Hernández Escobar. Cidade do México: Elephas, 2011.
 El mundo enemigo [O mundo inimigo]. Tradução Maria Cristina Hernández Escobar. Cidade do México: Elephas, 2012.
 Ellos eran muchos caballos [Eles eram muitos cavalos]. Tradução Mario Camara. Bogotá: Rey + Naranjo, 2012.

 French
 Tant et tant de chevaux [Eles eram muitos cavalos]. Tradução Jacques Thiériot. Paris: Éditions Métailié, 2005.
 Des gens heureux [Mamma, son tanto felice]. Tradução Jacques Thiériot. Paris: Éditions Métailié, 2007.
 Le monde ennemi [O mundo inimigo]. Tradução Jacques Thiériot. Paris: Éditions Métailié, 2010.

 Italian
 Come tanti cavalli [Eles eram muitos cavalos]. Tradução Patrizia di Malta. Milão: Bevivino Editore, 2003.
 Sono stato a Lisbona e ho pensato a te [Estive em Lisboa e lembrei de você]. Tradução Gian Luigi de Rosa. Roma: La Nuova Frontiera: 2011.

 Published in Portugal
 Eles eram muitos cavalos. Espinho: Quadrante Edições, 2006.
 Estive em Lisboa e lembrei-me de ti [Estive em Lisboa e lembrei de você]. Lisboa: Quetzal Edições, 2010.
 De mim já nem se lembra. Lisboa: Tinta da China, 2012.

 Anthologized works outside of Brazil
 A mancha. In: MÃE, Valter Hugo et alli (orgs.). Putas: novo conto português e brasileiro. Porto: Quasi, 2002, p. 149-161.
 L’ultima volta. In: Scrittori brasiliani. A cura di Giovanni Ricciardi. Trad. Jéssica Falconi. Napoli, Túlio Pironti, 2003, p. 611-612 (651–643).
 La demolición; la solución. In: NÁPOLI, Cristian de (org.). Terriblemente felices – nueva narrativa brasileña.. Buenos Aires, Emecê, 2007, p. 127-146.
 II profondo silenzio della domenica mattina. In: Il Brasile per le strade. A cura di Silvia Marianecci. Roma, Azimut, 2009, p. 61-74.
 Estação das águas. In: OLIVEIRA, Celina de; MATEUS, Victor Oliveira (orgs.). Um rio de contos – antologia luso-brasileira. Dafundo, Tágide, 2009, p. 152-155.
 Taxi. In: Brazil – a traveler'sem literary companion. Edited by Alexis Levitin. *Translated by Alison Entrekin. Berkeley, Wheresabout, 2010, p. 87-94.
 MARIANECCI, Silvia (org.). Latino americana: II Brasile per Le Strade. Itália: Azimut, 2009.

 Short stories published in foreign Journals, Magazines etc.
 The mark (A mancha). Brasil/Brazil, n. 24, ano 13, 2000. Translated by Marguerite Harrison, p. 77-86.
 Gua!. Grumo, n. 3, jul. 2004. Buenos Aires/Rio de Janeiro, p. 100-101.
 La démolition (A demolição). MEET, n. 9, nov. 2005, Maison des Écrivains Étrangers et des Tracduteurs de Saint Nazaire (France). Traduite de portugais (Brésil): Sébastien Roy. p. 51-57.
 La solution (A solução). Riveneuve – Continents, n. 2, printemps 2005, Marseille (France). Traduit de portugais (Brésil) par Luciana Uchôa, p. 245-252.
 A demolição. Maldoror – revista de la ciudad de Montevideo, n. 24, mayo 2006, p. 156-159.
 Haveres. Correntes d’Escritas, n. 6, fev. 2007, Póvoa do Varzim (Portugal), p. 27-30.
 Sorte teve a Sandra. Egoísta, n. 33, dez. 2007, Estoril (Portugal), p. 53-55.
 Ecos. Egoísta, n. 34, mar. 2008, Estoril (Portugal), p. 50.
 A cidade dorme. Sítio, n. 4, abr. 2008, Torres Vedras (Portugal), p. 5.
 Ellos eran muchos caballos (fragmentos). Quimera, n. 312, nov. 2009, Barcelona (Espanha), p. 54-57.

Awards and recognitions
2001 Prêmio APCA de Melhor Romance – eles eram muitos cavalos
2001 Menção Especial no Premio Casa de las Américas
2001 Prêmio Machado de Assis de Narrativa da Fundação Biblioteca Nacional
2005 Selecionado para Bolsa Vitae
2005 Prêmio APCA de Melhor Ficção – Mamma, son tanto Felice e O mundo inimigo
2006 Finalista do Prêmio Portugal Telecom
2007 Finalista Prêmio Zaffari Bourbon de Literatura
2007 Finalista Prêmio Jabuti
2010 São Paulo Prize for Literature — Shortlisted in the Best Book of the Year category for Estive em Lisboa e Lembrei de Você
2012 São Paulo Prize for Literature — Shortlisted in the Best Book of the Year category for Domingos sem Deus
2013 Premio Casa de las Américas – Domingos Sem Deus.

References

External links 
 Jornal Rascunho
 Folha de S.Paulo - Livros - Literatura: Para Ruffato, "busca pela felicidade apodrece tudo"
 Luiz Ruffato
 Um Escritor na Biblioteca: Luiz Ruffato - CÂNDIDO - Jornal da Biblioteca Pública do Paraná

Living people
Brazilian writers
1961 births